Magomedrasul Mukhtarovich Gazimagomedov (born April 8, 1991, in Dagestan) is a Russian freestyle wrestler of Tindian descent. He is two time World  Champion and a Grand Master of Sports in freestyle wrestling.

Nationally, Gazimagomedov won the Russian National Freestyle Wrestling Championships 2015. In the quarterfinals match he beat World Champion Khetag Tsabolov of North Ossetia–Alania. He defeated Israil Kasumov of Krasnoyarsk Krai in the final.

At the 2015 European Games, Gazimagomedov won gold in the men's freestyle 70 kg category. He won gold at the 2015 World Wrestling Championships in the 70 kg event, beating Iranian Hassan Yazdani. After knee injury he returned to wrestling at the Golden Grand Prix Ivan Yarygin 2018, in the final match losing to Magomed Kurbanaliev in a close match.

In pre-season he trains with MMA stars Rustam Khabilov and Khabib Nurmagomedov.

References

Living people
1991 births
People from Tsumadinsky District
Wrestlers at the 2015 European Games
European Games medalists in wrestling
European Games gold medalists for Russia
Russian male sport wrestlers
World Wrestling Championships medalists
European Wrestling Championships medalists
Sportspeople from Dagestan
20th-century Russian people
21st-century Russian people